Jessica Lucy Kilgour Harrison-Hall FSA (simplified Chinese: 霍吉淑; Traditional Chinese 霍吉淑; pinyin: Huò jí shū; born 1965) is a British art historian, sinologist, curator and author. She is currently Head of the China section, Curator of Chinese Ceramics and Decorative Arts at the British Museum and is also Curator of the Sir Percival David Collection at the British Museum. She researches, lectures and writes about Chinese history and its global connections through visual and material culture.

Biography
Harrison-Hall has an MA in Chinese and Fine Art from Edinburgh University (1987, including a year at the Chinese Language Department of University of Shandong in Jinan 1984–1985). In 1991, Harrison-Hall joined the British Museum as a project curator for Jessica Rawson in the Department of Oriental Antiquities (now department of Asia). She became Curator of Chinese Ceramics in 1994, curator of the Sir Percival David Collection in 2006, and Head of the China Section in 2015. She was President of the Oriental Ceramics Society from 2015 to 2018. She is the recipient of two major Arts and Humanities Research Council (AHRC) awards: "Ming Courts and Contacts 1400-1450" project (with (Craig Clunas) (2012) and "Cultural Creativity in Qing China 1796-1912" (with Julia Lovell) (2020)

She is married to the writer and film maker Martin Keady with whom she has three children.

Exhibitions and Galleries
 2017 - The Sir Joseph Hotung Gallery of China and South Asia* 1994 - "Ancient Chinese Trade Ceramics" staged at the National History Museum in Taipei.
 2014 - "Ming: Fifty Years that Changed China"
 2009-2012 - "China: Journey to the East" - a travelling exhibition, working with seven UK museums (Bristol City Museum & Art Gallery; The Herbert, Coventry, Willis Museum, Basingstoke; Museum and Winter Gardens, Sunderland; York City Gallery; Manchester Museum; Sheffield Museums Weston Park., accompanied by Harrison-Hall's children book Pocket Timeline of China (2007) 
 2000 - "Vietnam: Behind the Lines: Images of War 1965-75" - the first exhibition in the West to examine Northern Vietnamese artists work from the American-Vietnam war.

Awards and honours
Ming China: Courts and Contacts 1400-1450, jointly edited with Craig Clunas, Jessica Harrison-Hall and Yu-ping Luk (2016). The book was described by the judges as 'An outstanding connective history in pursuit of China's historical difference’

Selected publications
 China: A History in Objects, Thames and Hudson, London, 2017. . Italian and Portuguese translations (2018); Chinese (Taiwan), Chinese (China), Korean translations (2019-2020)
 Ming China: Courts and Contacts 1400-1450 (2016) (Co edited with Craig Clunas and Yu-ping Luk) 
 Ming: 50 years that changed China, British Museum Publications, London, 2014 (Co edited with Craig Clunas) 
 Ming: Art, People and Places, British Museum Publications, London, 2014. 
 Passion for Porcelain: Masterpieces of Ceramics from the British Museum and the Victoria and Albert Museum, (co-authors Luisa Mengoni, Hilary Williams, Aileen Dawson), National Museum of China, Beijing, (2012) Lu Zhangshen (ed.)  (Chinese and English)
 Chinese Ceramics: Highlights of the Sir Percival David Collection, (co-author Regina Krahl), London, 2009  (translated into Chinese)
 Vietnam: Behind the Lines - Images from the War 1965-75, British Museum Publications, London, 2002. .
 Ming Ceramics - A Catalogue of the late Yuan and Ming Ceramics in the British Museum, British Museum Publications, London, 2001. . Translated as Catalogue of Ming Ceramics in the British Museum. Volumes 1 and 2 / 大英博物館藏中國明代陶瓷, Beijing 2014

References

1965 births
Living people
Employees of the British Museum
British sinologists
British art historians
Women art historians
Alumni of the University of Edinburgh
British curators
Fellows of the Society of Antiquaries of London